Poecilomallus palpalis is a species of beetle in the family Cerambycidae, the only species in the genus Poecilomallus.

References

Elaphidiini